Kypria may refer to:
 Cypria (AKA Kypria), an epic poem of ancient Greek literature
 Kypria festival, an annual international festival in Cyprus